The sixth series of Dancing with the Stars premiered on 31 May 2015 on TV3, and was hosted by Dominic Bowden and Sharyn Casey. Stefano Olivieri, Hayley Holt, and Candy Lane were the series' judges; Lane served as the head judge.

Cast

Couples

Scorecard

Red numbers indicate the couples with the lowest score for each week.
Green numbers indicate the couples with the highest score for each week.
 indicates the couples eliminated that week.
 indicates the returning couple that finished in the bottom two.
 indicates the winning couple.
 indicates the runner-up couple.
 indicates the couple who placed third.

Average score chart
This table only counts for dances scored on a 30-point scale.

Highest and lowest scoring performances
The best and worst performances in each dance according to the judges' 30-point scale are as follows:

Couples' highest and lowest scoring dances
Scores are based upon a potential 30-point maximum.

Weekly scores
Individual judges' scores in the charts below (given in parentheses) are listed in this order from left to right: Stefano Olivieri, Candy Lane, Hayley Holt.

Week 1 
Couples performed the cha-cha-cha, foxtrot or jive.
Running order

Week 2 
Running order

Week 3: Latin Night 
Couples performed Latin-themed dances.
Running order

Week 4: Winter Wonderland Night 
Couples performed in a Winter Wonderland special.
Running order

Week 5: Movie Night 
Couples performed to movie classics.

Running order

Week 6: 80s Night 
Couples performed dances to music from the decade of the 80s.

Running order

Week 7: Semi-Final
Couples performed two dances for the first time in the competition, one involving a prop and the second a freestyle routine.

Running order

Week 8: Final
Couples performed two dances, one new style and their favourite dance of the season to reprise.

Running order (Dance 1)

Running order (Dance 2)

Dance chart

 Highest scoring dance
 Lowest scoring dance

References

series 6
2015 New Zealand television seasons